Irishtown-Summerside is a town in the Canadian province of Newfoundland and Labrador. It is located about 2.5 miles north of Corner Brook. The Post Office was established on March 1, 1965 and the first Postmistress was Blanch Anderson. The town had a population of 1,418 in the Canada 2016 Census.  This contiguous settlement was formerly two separate villages, one of which was known originally as Petipas (or Petipa's) Cove.  Two smaller settlements (Davis (or Davis's) Cove and Christopher's Cove) were formerly both separately reported in the census.

Demographics 

See also
 List of cities and towns in Newfoundland and Labrador

References 

Towns in Newfoundland and Labrador